34th Street station is an underground station on the SEPTA Market-Frankford Line, located at the intersection of 34th Street and Market Street in Philadelphia, Pennsylvania, in the University City neighborhood of West Philadelphia. The station is on the Drexel University campus, adjacent to the Daskalakis Athletic Center, and near the University of Pennsylvania campus and the University City Science Center.

The station is also served by SEPTA bus routes , and LUCY loops.

History 

The PRT announced a project to bury the elevated tracks between 23rd to 46th streets in the 1920s. The tunnel from 23rd to 32nd streets was completed by 1933, but construction on the remaining segment was put on hiatus due to the Great Depression and World War II. The PRT went bankrupt in 1939 and was reorganized as the PTC, which began building the rest of the tunnel in 1947.

34th Street is one of three stations on the Market–Frankford Line that is not ADA-accessible, the other two being  and  stations. The addition of elevators in the station was announced in SEPTA's 2021–2032 Capital Program proposal; the station platforms would be rehabilitated and made accessible to passengers with disabilities by 2030 at an estimated cost of $30 million. In 2022, SEPTA revised the project's budget to $31 million and estimated design and construction would be complete by 2025. The project now also includes the renovation of the existing platforms, new signage, lighting, and security cameras, as well as waterproofing improvements.

Station layout 
Unlike most underground Market–Frankford Line stations, 34th Street has a single island platform.

References

External links 
 

SEPTA Market-Frankford Line stations
Railway stations in Philadelphia
Railway stations in the United States opened in 1956
University City, Philadelphia
Railway stations located underground in Pennsylvania
Railway stations in Pennsylvania at university and college campuses
1956 establishments in Pennsylvania